The Death Note is a 2016 Chinese horror suspense thriller film directed by Jiang Jun and starring Cao Feiran, Li Zheng and Li Ben. It was released in China by Shanghai Zhaoyang Entertainment and Beijing Huanying Shidai Media on May 20, 2016.

The film mainly tells the story of Liang Qian, a rebellious young woman, who caused her grandmother's accidental death, and the notes left behind by her grandmother after her death record the mystery of her life.

Cast
Cao Feiran
Li Zheng
Li Ben

Reception
The film grossed  at the Chinese box office.

References

Chinese horror thriller films
2016 horror films
2016 horror thriller films